Mount Perren is located on the border of Alberta and British Columbia on the Continental Divide. It was named in 1968 after Walter Perren, a Swiss climbing guide and Parks Canada service warden. The peak forms part of the backdrop to Moraine Lake in the Valley of the Ten Peaks of Banff National Park.


Geology

The mountains in Banff Park are composed of sedimentary rock laid down during the Precambrian to Jurassic periods. Formed in shallow seas, this sedimentary rock was pushed east and over the top of younger rock during the Laramide orogeny.

Climate

Based on the Köppen climate classification, the mountain has a subarctic climate with cold, snowy winters, and mild summers. Temperatures can drop below -20 C with wind chill factors below -30 C in the winter.

Further reading
 Dave Birrell, 50 Roadside Panoramas in the Canadian Rockies, P 87

 Western Canada, P 279

See also
 List of peaks on the British Columbia–Alberta border

References

External links
 Parks Canada web site: Banff National Park

Three-thousanders of Alberta
Three-thousanders of British Columbia
Mountains of Banff National Park
Kootenay National Park